Osea or OSEA may refer to:

Places
 Osea Island, an inhabited island in the estuary of the River Blackwater, Essex, East England

Organizations or other items with the name or acronym
 Oregon Safe Employment Act (OSEA), the legislative act which gives the US State of Oregon the authority to administer OSHA regulations (see Oregon Occupational Safety and Health Division)
 Cyclone Osea, the second of seven cyclones to affect French Polynesia during the 1997-98 South Pacific cyclone season
 Ontario Sustainable Energy Association (OSEA), a non-profit organization supporting the growth of renewable energy projects in Ontario, Canada
Osea, the third album (released in 2013) of Irish musical duo "Hudson Taylor" (see Hudson Taylor (musician))
 Osea, a fictional country in Ace Combat 5: The Unsung War, Zero: The Belkan War, and 7: Skies Unknown

People with the given name
 Osea Kolinisau (born 1985), Fijian rugby player
 Osea Sadrau (born 1986), Fijian rugby league player for AS Carcassonne in the Elite One Championship;
 Osea Vakatalesau (born 1986), Fijian football striker playing for the Fiji national football team; or the

Similar
 Oséas (born 1971), fully Oséas Reis dos Santos, a retired Brazilian football player;
 Oseas Guiñazú, fully Oseas Guiñazú Estrella, an Argentine politician of the late 19th century;
 OSEAX, the Oslo Børs All Share Index, a financial index operated by the Oslo Stock Exchange